Kalag-e Amjadi (also Romanized as Kalag-e Amjadī; also known as Kalag, Kaleg, Kaleg-e Amjadī, Kaleg, Kaleg, and Kaleg) is a village in Gavrud Rural District, in the Central District of Sonqor County, Kermanshah Province, Iran. At the 2006 census, its population was 618, in 143 families.

References 

Populated places in Sonqor County